Guddi is an 2022 Indian Bengali language romantic drama television series that premiered on 28 February 2022 and airs on Bengali General Entertainment Channel Star Jalsha and is also available on the digital platform Disney+ Hotstar. The show is produced by Magic Moments Motion Pictures of Saibal Banerjee and Leena Gangopadhyay and stars Shyamoupti Mudly, Ranojoy Bishnu and Madhurima Basak in lead roles. Recently the close moments between lead pairs spark controversy and also encourages the extramarital affairs through its storyline.

Plot
The story opens with featuring, a young girl from Darjeeling aspires to become a police officer. However, along her path, her life gets entwined with Anuj, a successful police officer who she initially considers an inspiration to serve the country. She gets married to Anuj out of compromise due to a series of events, while the latter is in love with his childhood friend and Guddi's teacher, Shirin. Guddi eventually unknowingly begins developing feelings for Anuj.

However, as Shirin's wrath grows for Guddi, several events finally lead to the Guddi divorcing Anuj and the latter marrying Shirin. After moving on in life, Guddi marries Judhajit, a humble and supportive man, and Anuj's cousin, who she goes on to eventually fall in love with.

6 Years Later
Guddi is now a successful police-officer in Darjeeling. Anuj and Shirin have a son, Bublu, while the couple face problems in their marriage as Shirin begins having an extra-marital affair with another man. Shirin doesn't accept Bublu as her son and shows cruelty with him. Eventually due to circumstances, Bublu meets Guddi and the two develop a growing mother-son bond while the latter is unaware of him being Anuj's son.

Cast

Main
 Shyamoupti Mudly as SP Guddi Chatterjee (née Sarkar) – a police officer, Anuj's first wife turned junior colleague,Judhajit's wife, Bohoru's daughter, an orphan (2022 – present)
 Ranojoy Bishnu as DIG Anuj Chatterjee aka Piklu – a police officer, Guddi's first husband turned senior colleague , Shirin's husband,Bublu's father (2022 – present)
 Madhurima Basak as Shirin Chatterjee (née Banerjee) – Guddi's school teacher and so-called elder sister, Anuj's love interest turned second wife,Bublu's mother. (2022 – present)
 Debottam Majumdar as Judhajit Chatterjee - a doctor, Anuj and Tutul's second-cousin,Guddi's husband (2022 - present)

Recurring

 Chandan Sen as Bohoru Sarkar – Guddi's father (Deceased) (2022)
 Shankar Chakraborty as Amitabha Chatterjee aka Jethumoni – Anuj's elder paternal uncle, Tutul and Sohag's father, Guddi's father figure (2022 – present)
 Sohini Sengupta as Maammaam – Jethumoni's wife and Anuj's aunt (2022 – present)
 Sudip Mukherjee as Pinaki Chatterjee – Anuj's father (2022 – present)
 Bidisha Chakraborty as Notun bou, Pinaki's second wife, Anuj's stepmother (2022 – present)
 Ambarish Bhattacharya as Dodul – Anuj's younger paternal uncle (2022 – present)
 Rajanya Mitra as Keya aka Keya Phool – Dodul's wife and Anuj's aunt (2022 – present)
 Hridlekha Banerjee as Sohaag – Jethumoni's daughter and Anuj's cousin sister (2022 – present)
 Biswabasu Biswas as Anirban, Sohaag's husband (2022 – present)
 Tathagata Mukherjee as Aabir Chatterjee aka Tutul – Anuj's cousin brother, Jethumoni's son, Mithi's husband, Guddi's college professor and her sworn  elder brother. (2022 – present)
 Lovely Maitra as Mithi – Tutul's wife, Guddi's sworn  elder sister and Anuj's sister-in-law (2022 – present)
 Malabika Sen as Chaitali Banerjee, Shirin's mother (2022 – present)
 Debasish Roy Chowdhury as Bhaskar Banerjee, Shirin's father and Pinaki's friend (2022 – present)
 Prasun Banerjee as Kinkshuk Sen, a senior police officer and Anuj's senior (2022 – present)
 Kaushiki Basu as Queen, Anuj's half-sister (2022 – present)
 Monalisa Paul as Tutul's sister, Jethumoni's daughter (2022 – present)
 Anindita Raychaudhury as Koushola Chatterjee - Judhajit's mother, Anandashankar's wife, Guddi's mother in-law. (2022 – present)

References

External links
 Guddi at Disney+ Hotstar

Bengali-language television programming in India
2022 Indian television series debuts
Star Jalsha original programming
Indian drama television series